The 2012 American Samoa Republican presidential caucuses was held on March 13, 2012. 70 registered Republicans selected six delegates in a closed-door meeting to represent the territory in the 2012 Republican National Convention. On March 14, 2012, Dr. Victor T. Tofaeono, the chair for the Republican Party of American Samoa, announced that all six delegates, along with three at-large delegates, had pledged their support to Mitt Romney.

Results
The closed-door caucus, held at the Toa Bar & Grill restaurant, saw to the election of six delegates and three at-large delegates (Chair, National Committeeman and National Committeewoman) for the 2012 Republican National Convention. Seventy registered Republicans attended the caucus. However, the vote distribution was not released to the media.

Delegates
 Falema'o M. “Phil” Pili
 Su'a Carl Schuster
 Lealaisalanoa Aofaga Mickey R. Salanoa
 Brandon Smart
 Salote Lutu Schuster
 Ali Pili

At-Large Delegates
Chairman: Dr. Victor T. Tofaeono
National Committeeman: High Chief Aumoeualogo T. J. Fuavai
National Committeewoman: Amata Coleman Radewagen

Dr. Tofaeno subsequently announced on March 14, 2012, that all nine delegates have pledged their support to Mitt Romney.
“We're excited and look forward to the national convention to cast our nine delegate votes for Gov. Mitt Romney, the next President of the United States..”

See also 
 Republican Party presidential debates, 2012
 Republican Party presidential primaries, 2012
 Results of the 2012 Republican Party presidential primaries

References

External links
The Green Papers: Major state elections in chronological order

2012 American Samoa elections
American Samoa
2012
March 2012 events in the United States